P. J. O'Connell (born 1970 in O'Callaghan's Mills, County Clare) is a former Irish sportsperson.  He played hurling with his local club O'Callaghan's Mills and was a member of the Clare senior inter-county team in the 1980s and 1990s. O'Connell won two All-Ireland titles with Clare in 1995 and 1997 and three Munster titles.

Honours

Clare
All-Ireland Senior Hurling Championship (2): 1995, 1997 
Munster Senior Hurling Championship (3): 1995, 1997, 1998

References

1970 births
Living people
O'Callaghan's Mills hurlers
Clare inter-county hurlers
Munster inter-provincial hurlers
All-Ireland Senior Hurling Championship winners